Arsinoë IV (between 68 and 63 BC – 41 BC) was the fourth of six children and the youngest daughter of Ptolemy XII Auletes. Queen and co-ruler of Ptolemaic Egypt with her brother Ptolemy XIII from 48 BC – 47 BC, she was one of the last members of the Ptolemaic dynasty of ancient Egypt. Arsinoë IV was also the half sister of Cleopatra VII. For her role in conducting the siege of Alexandria (47 BC) against her sister Cleopatra, Arsinoë was taken as a prisoner of war to Rome by the Roman triumvir Julius Caesar following the defeat of Ptolemy XIII in the Battle of the Nile. Arsinoë was then exiled to the Temple of Artemis at Ephesus in Roman Anatolia, but she was executed there by orders of triumvir Mark Antony in 41 BC at the behest of his lover Cleopatra VII.

History 
Arsinoë was the third, possibly fourth daughter of Ptolemy XII by an unknown woman (presumably since Cleopatra VII's probable mother Cleopatra V had died or been repudiated not long after Cleopatra VII was born.) When Ptolemy XII died in 51 BC, he left his eldest son and daughter, Ptolemy and Cleopatra, as joint rulers of Egypt, but Ptolemy soon dethroned Cleopatra and forced her to flee from Alexandria. Julius Caesar arrived in Alexandria in 48 BC pursuing his rival, Pompey, whom he had defeated at the Battle of Pharsalus. When he arrived in Alexandria, he was presented with Pompey's head. The execution of his longterm rival ended the possibility of an alliance between Caesar and Ptolemy, and he sided with Cleopatra's faction. He declared that in accordance with Ptolemy XII's will, Cleopatra and Ptolemy would rule Egypt jointly, and in a similar motion restored Cyprus, which had been annexed by Rome in 58 BC, to Egypt's rule and gave it to Arsinoë and her youngest brother, Ptolemy XIV.

However, Arsinoë then escaped from the capital with her mentor, the eunuch Ganymedes, and took command of the Egyptian army. She also proclaimed herself Queen as Arsinoë IV, executed Achillas, and placed Ganymedes second in command of the army immediately below herself. Under Arsinoë's leadership, the Egyptians enjoyed some success against the Romans. The Egyptians trapped Caesar in a section of the city by building walls to close off the streets. Then Arsinoë directed Ganymedes to pour seawater into the canals that supplied Caesar's cisterns which caused panic among Caesar's troops. Caesar countered this measure by digging wells into the porous limestone beneath the city that contained fresh water. This only partially alleviated the situation, so he then sent ships out along the coast to search for more fresh water there. Caesar realized that he would need to break out of the city and hoped to do so by gaining control of the harbor. He launched an attack to seize control of the Lighthouse of Alexandria but Arsinoë's forces drove him back. Recognizing his imminent defeat, Caesar removed his armor and purple cloak so that he could swim to the safety of a nearby Roman ship.

The leading Egyptian officers, having become disappointed with Ganymedes, and under a pretext of wanting peace, negotiated with Caesar to exchange Arsinoë for Ptolemy XIII. After Ptolemy was released he continued the war until the Romans received reinforcements and inflicted a decisive defeat upon the Egyptians. Arsinoë, now in Roman captivity, was transported to Rome, where in 46 BC she was forced to appear in Caesar's triumph and was paraded behind a burning effigy of the Lighthouse of Alexandria, which had been the scene of her victory over him. Arsinoe, along with Juba II, elicited empathy from the crowd. Despite the custom of strangling prominent prisoners in triumphs when the festivities concluded, Caesar was pressured to spare Arsinoë and granted her sanctuary at the temple of Artemis in Ephesus. Arsinoë lived in the temple for a few years, always keeping a watchful eye on her sister Cleopatra, who perceived Arsinoë as a threat to her power. In 41 BC, at Cleopatra's instigation, Mark Antony ordered Arsinoë's execution on the steps of the temple. Her murder was a gross violation of the temple sanctuary and an act that scandalised Rome. The eunuch priest (Megabyzos) who had welcomed Arsinoë on her arrival at the temple as "queen" was only pardoned when an embassy from Ephesus made a petition to Cleopatra.

Year of birth 
Arsinoë's year of birth is generally regarded as being between 68 and 63 BC: The Encyclopædia Britannica cites 63 BC, making her 15 at the time of her uprising and defeat against Julius Caesar and 22 at her death, while the researcher Alissa Lyon cites 68 BC making her 27 at her death. Joyce Tyldesley places her birth date as between 68 and 65 BC. An alternate hypothesis was in the docudrama "Cleopatra: Portrait of a Killer", in which it was alleged a headless skeleton of a female child between the ages of 15 and 18 may be Arsinoë.

Her actions in the brief war against Caesar naturally suggest that she was older than that and thus, would make it impossible for her to be the headless female child buried in the tomb. Perhaps the strongest evidence that she was in fact exercising her own authority is that Caesar, after the Pharos debacle, was prepared to release Ptolemy XIII — a male, who continued the war against Caesar — just to get his hands on her. Stacy Schiff, who places Arsinoë's age at around seventeen during the events of 48-47 BC, notes that Arsinoë "burned with ambition" and was "not the kind of girl who inspired complacency," writing that once Arsinoë escaped the royal palace she became more vocal against her half-sister and that she assumed her position as head of the army alongside anti-Caesar courtier Achillas.

Tomb at Ephesus 
In the 1990s an octagonal monument situated in the centre of Ephesus was hypothesized by Hilke Thür of the Austrian Academy of Sciences to be the tomb of Arsinoë. Although no inscription remains on the tomb, it was dated to between 50 and 20 BC. In 1926 the skeleton of a female estimated to be between the ages of 15 and 18 years at the time of her death was found in the burial chamber. Thür's identification of the skeleton was based on the shape of the tomb, which was octagonal, like the second tier of the Lighthouse of Alexandria, the carbon dating of the bones (between 200 and 20 BC), the gender of the skeleton, and the age of the child at death. It was also claimed that the tomb boasts Egyptian motifs, such as "papyri-bundle" columns.

A DNA test was also attempted to determine the identity of the child. However, it was impossible to get an accurate reading since the bones had been handled too many times, and the skull had been lost in Germany during World War II. Hilke Thür examined the old notes and photographs of the now-missing skull, which was reconstructed using computer technology by forensic anthropologist Caroline Wilkinson to show what the woman may have looked like. Thür alleged that it shows signs of African ancestry mixed with classical Grecian features – despite the fact that Boas, Gravlee, Bernard and Leonard, and others have demonstrated that skull measurements are not a reliable indicator of race, and the measurements were jotted down in 1920 before modern forensic science took hold. Furthermore, Arsinoë and Cleopatra, shared the same father (Ptolemy XII Auletes) but had different mothers, with Thür claiming the alleged African ancestry came from the skeleton's mother.

Mary Beard wrote a dissenting essay criticizing the findings, pointing out that, first, there is no surviving name on the tomb and that the claim the tomb is alleged to invoke the shape of the Pharos Lighthouse "doesn't add up"; second, the skull doesn't survive intact and the age of the skeleton is too young to be Arsinoë's (the bones said to be that of a 15-18 year old, with Arsinoë being around her mid twenties at her death); and third, since Cleopatra and Arsinoë were not known to have the same mother, "the ethnic argument goes largely out of the window." Furthermore, craniometry as used by Thür to determine race is based in scientific racism that is now generally considered a pseudoscience that supported exploitation of groups of people to perpetuate racial oppression and distorted future views of the biological basis of race.

A writer from The Times described the identification of the skeleton as "a triumph of conjecture over certainty". If the monument is the tomb of Arsinoë, she would be the only member of the Ptolemaic dynasty whose remains have been recovered. It has never been definitively proven the skeleton is that of Arsinoë IV.

References

Bibliography

External links 

 livius.org: Arsinoe IV
 Pockley.S: Video of a bust of Arsinoë IV being copied Nov 2012 Arsinoe IV

60s BC births
41 BC deaths
1st-century BC Pharaohs
Cleopatra
Ancient Egyptian queens regnant
Pharaohs of the Ptolemaic dynasty
Ptolemaic princesses
1st-century BC women rulers
1st-century BC Greek people
1st-century BC Egyptian people
Egyptian people murdered abroad
Assassinated Egyptian people
Female pharaohs